Erlanger is a German-Jewish surname derived from the city of Erlangen. Notable people with the surname include:

 A. L. Erlanger (1859–1930), American theatrical producer and director
 Camille Erlanger (1863–1919), French composer 
 Jeff Erlanger (1970–2007), American activist
 Joseph Erlanger (1874–1965), American physiologist
 Steven Erlanger (born c. 1952), American journalist

and members of the German-French-English banking dynasty (Barons d'Erlanger, see: Erlanger family tree), including:
 Frédéric Émile d'Erlanger (1832–1911), German financier
 Emile Beaumont Baron d’Erlanger (1866–1939), banker, musician  ⚭ Catherine, Baroness d'Erlanger, née Catherine Robert d'Aqueria de Rochegude
 Gérard John Leo Regis Baron d’Erlanger (1905–1962), partner of Erlanger Ltd. and Myers & Co
Frédéric Alfred Baron d’Erlanger (Freddy, 1868–1943), banker and composer
Francois Rodolphe Baron d’Erlanger (1872–1932), French painter, orientalist and musicologist specializing in Arabic music, built Ennejma Ezzahra Palace near Tunis
Leo Frédéric Alfred Baron d'Erlanger (1898–1978), banker in London (Erlanger Ltd.), sold the bank in 1958 to Hill, Samuel & Co, then Philip Hill Higginson Erlanger Ltd
 Carlo von Erlanger (1872–1904), German ornithologist and explorer

See also
Erlanger (disambiguation)

German-language surnames
Jewish surnames